The Self Regional Healthcare Foundation Women's Health Classic was a tournament on the Symetra Tour, the LPGA's developmental tour. It was part of the Symetra Tour's schedule between 2014 and 2018. It was held at The Links at Stoney Point in Greenwood, South Carolina. 

Title sponsor was Self Regional Healthcare, a hospital in Greenwood. At inception it featured the Symetra Tour's largest purse, totaling $200,000.

In 2016 it was a joint event with the Legends Tour's Legends at Stoney Point.

Winners

References

Former Symetra Tour events
Golf in South Carolina